Judie Bamber (born 1961) is an American artist based in Los Angeles. Her often representational paintings explore themes of gender, sexuality, temporality, and memory. She teaches in the Master of Fine Arts program at Otis College of Art and Design and is best known for Are You My Mother?, which was featured in New American Paintings in 2003 and 2004. Her paintings, watercolors and graffiti emphasize women's pleasure, as well as to permeate her family history.

Early life and education

Judie Bamber was born in Detroit, Michigan in 1961. She received her BFA from California Institute of the Arts in 1983.

Works
Judie Bamber creates representational paintings and drawings based on photographic sources ranging from images of female genitalia to seascapes. 
Her early work included still lifes in which objects, painted to scale, floated in front of monochromatic color fields. In the mid-1990s, in a collection of works without a name, she painted photorealistic "portraits" of  vaginas. In 2002, Bamber began a series of seascapes, making initial plain-air watercolor sketches that she then used for oil paintings. From 2005 to 2014, she worked on the project  Are You My Mother?, consisting of small-scale representational watercolors and graphite drawings, based on posed erotic and fashion like Polaroids her father took of her mother in the 1960s.

Awards
 2008 City of Los Angeles (C.O.L.A.) Individual Artist Fellowship
 2008 California Community Foundation Fellowship

Exhibitions

Selected solo shows

 Gorney Bravin + Lee, New York, NY (2004)
 Pomona College Museum of Art, Project Series 26 (2005)  
 Angles Gallery, Los Angeles, CA (2008)
 Are You My Mother?, Angles Gallery (2011)

Selected group exhibitions
 Women by Women, Heiner Contemporary, Washington, D.C. (2011) 
 Sexual Politics: Judy Chicago's Dinner Part in Feminist Art History, Hammer Museum, Los Angeles (1996)

References

1961 births
Living people
California Institute of the Arts alumni
Otis College of Art and Design faculty
American women painters
21st-century American women artists
American women academics